Summer Place Wanted is a 1957 Swedish comedy film directed by Hasse Ekman. It was entered into the 1st Moscow International Film Festival, where Ekman was nominated for a Grand Prix.

Plot
Ingeborg Dahlstrom puts in an ad in the Swedish newspaper Svenska Dagbladet, she is looking for a summer house. Later Ingeborg, her husband Gustaf and their 17-year-old daughter Mona travel to Stockholm archipelago, to the place they got hold of with the ad. It turns out, however, that the man they hire the house from takes a big interest in Ingeborg. But it's not only Ingeborg who gets courted elsewhere, so is Gustaf.

Cast
 Eva Dahlbeck as Ingeborg Dahlström
 Gunnar Björnstrand as Lawyer Gustaf Dahlström
 Bibi Andersson as Mona Dahlström
 Birgitte Reimer as Lizzy
 Alf Kjellin as Arne Forsman, artist
  as Tom Åkermark
 Sigge Fürst as Nisse Persson

References

External links

1957 films
1957 comedy films
Swedish comedy films
1950s Swedish-language films
Films directed by Hasse Ekman
1950s Swedish films